Martín Bustos Moyano (born July 12, 1985 in Córdoba, Argentina) is an Argentine rugby union player, previously with the French Top 14 club Montpellier and in the Pro D2 for Bayonne. He plays in both the fullback and wing positions. In May 2010 he was selected in a squad of over 40 players to represent Argentina in the two-test Summer tour of Argentina.

See also
2009 Americas Rugby Championship season

External links
Profile at scrum.com

1985 births
Living people
Argentine rugby union players
Montpellier Hérault Rugby players
Aviron Bayonnais players
Pampas XV players
Rugby union fullbacks
Rugby union wings
Argentina international rugby sevens players
Sportspeople from Córdoba, Argentina